Kate Helen Osborne is a British Labour Party politician who has served as the Member of Parliament (MP) for Jarrow since 2019.

Career
Osborne worked for Royal Mail for 25 years. Her first foray into politics came in 2009, when she contested a by-election for Preston ward on North Tyneside Council, losing out to Conservative David Sarin. The following year, Osborne was elected to represent the ward at the 2010 local elections, gaining the seat from the Conservative incumbent. She was re-elected to represent Preston in 2014, and again in 2018. Osborne did not stand at the 2022 North Tyneside elections.

She was elected to the House of Commons at the 2019 United Kingdom general election, representing Jarrow, a safe seat for Labour. She succeeded the party's former MP Stephen Hepburn, who had been prevented from standing again over allegations of misconduct. Osborne is a member of Labour's left-wing Socialist Campaign Group.

Osborne was appointed Parliamentary Private Secretary (PPS) to the Shadow Home Affairs team, led by Shadow Home Secretary Diane Abbott, in January 2020. She served until the front bench reshuffle following Keir Stamer's election as Labour Leader in April 2020. Osborne returned as a PPS in December 2021, this time to the Shadow Northern Ireland team led by Shadow Secretary of State Peter Kyle.

In 2021, she was selected for the Armed Forces Parliamentary Scheme, assigned to the Royal Air Force.

During the June 2022 rail strikes, Osborne joined a picket line with railway workers, reportedly going against orders from her party not to do so. Commenting, she said, "Solidarity to workers on strike today, they have my full support."

Personal life 
Osborne is an activist and campaigner in the trade union and LGBT+ movements.

She was married to Pamela Brooks, a former North Tyneside councillor. The couple served on the council at the same time, including four years in which they both represented Preston ward. Brooks gained Preston from the Conservative candidate who had defeated her partner in 2009. Osborne has two sons and lives in her Jarrow constituency.

On 16 March 2020, Osborne became the second British Member of Parliament to test positive for Coronavirus disease 2019 (COVID-19), after Conservative Nadine Dorries. She was in self-isolation in her London flat for three weeks.

References

External links

Living people
21st-century British women politicians
Councillors in Tyne and Wear
Female members of the Parliament of the United Kingdom for English constituencies
Labour Party (UK) councillors
Labour Party (UK) MPs for English constituencies
LGBT members of the Parliament of the United Kingdom
English LGBT politicians
British LGBT rights activists
Royal Mail people
UK MPs 2019–present
21st-century English women
21st-century English people
Women councillors in England